Almirante Ferrándiz was a  in the Spanish Republican Navy. She took part in the Spanish Civil War on the government side.

She was named in honor of José Ferrándiz y Niño, a Spanish Admiral and former Navy Minister.

History
Almirante Ferrándiz took part in the Gibraltar Strait blockade.

In response, the Nationalist heavy cruiser  (which Republicans believed had been damaged by an aerial bomb) and the light cruiser  were sent to break the blockade.

Canarias stopped to rescue 31 sailors from Almirante Ferrándiz and authorized the French liner Koutubia to pick up another 26, including her commander, José Luis Barbastro Jiménez.

References

External links
Destroyers of the Spanish civil war (in Spanish)
Wrecksite, Spanish Republican Navy (1936-39)
 

Churruca-class destroyers
Ships built in Cartagena, Spain
1928 ships
Spanish Republican Navy
Military units and formations of the Spanish Civil War
Shipwrecks in the Mediterranean Sea
Shipwrecks of the Spanish Civil War